Phacelia curvipes is a species of flowering plant in the borage family, Boraginaceae, known by the common names Washoe phacelia and Washoe scorpionweed. It is native to the southwestern United States, where it grows in many types of habitat, such as chaparral, oak and pine woodland, and forests.

Description
Phacelia curvipes is an annual herb producing a small, branching stem up to about 15 centimeters long. It is glandular and hairy in texture. The leaves are oval or lance-shaped, 1 to 4 centimeters long, and borne on petioles. The hairy inflorescence is a cyme of several flowers. The flower has a bell-shaped or rounded, flattened corolla under a centimeter long. It is blue or purple with a white throat.

References

External links
Calflora Database: Phacelia curvipes (Washoe phacelia)
Phacelia curvipes — CalPhotos gallery

curvipes
Flora of Arizona
Flora of California
Flora of Nevada
Flora of Utah
Flora of the California desert regions
Flora of the Great Basin
Flora of the Sierra Nevada (United States)
Natural history of the California chaparral and woodlands
Natural history of the Mojave Desert
Natural history of the Peninsular Ranges
Natural history of the Transverse Ranges